The Paraguayan Basketball Federation (in Spanish: Confederación Paraguaya de Básquetbol) is the governing body of basketball in Paraguay. The PBF organizes male and female competitions for both the National League (for teams outside of Asunción) and the Metropolitan League (only for teams from Asunción), and runs the Paraguay national basketball team.

History
In 1936, no governing body of basketball existed in Paraguay, so basketball was part of the Paraguayan Sports Association until 1947, the year in which the Paraguayan Basketball Federation was founded. That same year, it joined the International Basketball Federation (FIBA).

References

External links
Paraguayan Basketball Info

National members of the FIBA Americas
Basketball in Paraguay
1947 establishments in Paraguay
Paraguay
Basketball
Sports organizations established in 1947